The Best American Poetry 1999, a volume in The Best American Poetry series, was edited by David Lehman and by guest editor Robert Bly.

Poets and poems included

See also
 1999 in poetry

Notes

External links
 Web page for contents of the book, with links to each publication where the poems originally appeared

Reviews
  "On the Prosing of Poetry: How Contemporary American Poets Are Denaturing the Poem", by Joan Houlihan at Boston Comment Web site. (A negative reaction to much in this volume)
  "What is Found", a positive review in Thumbscrew, No. 16, Summer 2000

Best American Poetry series
1999 poetry books
American poetry anthologies